Monmouthshire Building Society,,  is a building society based in Newport, Wales. The Society provides typical building society services including: a range of mortgage and savings products. insurance, financial planning, legal services and funeral plans some of which are provided via third-party companies.

The Society is a founder member of the Building Societies Association and Council of Mortgage Lenders, as well as being a member of the Financial Services Compensation Scheme.

Monmouthshire Building Society is a mutual organisation and operates through a network of branch and agency offices, covering the M4 corridor from Chepstow in the east, to Swansea in the west.

The building society also operates the Monmouthshire Building Society Charitable Foundation which is used to support charities and other social initiatives.

The Society had a subsidiary company, Monmouthshire Insurance Services, a commercial insurance broker. The business was sold to  Thomas Carroll Group Ltd on 1 April 2016.

The Society is authorised by the Prudential Regulation Authority and regulated by the Financial Conduct Authority and the Prudential Authority. Financial Services Register Number 206052.

History

The society was formed in January 1869 as the Monmouthshire and South Wales Permanent Investment Benefit Building Society. Five of the original board of directors went on to be mayors of Newport.

In 1890 the operations were moved to new offices in Friars Chambers, Dock Street, where the Head Office stands today, although the development of John Frost Square meant the rebuilding of the offices. The Society's name has been shortened over the years; the most recent name change coincided with the Society's centenary in 1969.

References

External links
Monmouthshire Building Society
Building Societies Association
KPMG Building Societies Database 2008

Building societies of Wales
Banks established in 1869
Organizations established in 1869
History of Monmouthshire
Companies based in Newport, Wales
Organisations based in Newport, Wales
1869 establishments in Wales